is a Japanese voice actress currently working for I'm Enterprise.

Performance

Anime television
 Goshūshō-sama Ninomiya-kun (Irori Okushiro)
 The Story of Saiunkoku: 2nd Series (Shūran)
 Papillon Rose New Season (Kimi) 
 Futakoi, Futakoi Alternative (Yura Sakurazuki)
 Elemental Gelade (Challo)
 Negima!: Magister Negi Magi (Tsukuyomi)
 Trouble Chocolate (Azuki)
 Cyborg Kuro-chan (Nana) 
 Platonic Chain (Kanae Mizuhara)
 Weiß Kreuz Glühen (Layla)
 Bleach (Sachi Tenku)

Internet Radio
 Hiromi to Yumi no Chicchai Futari
 Take-chan・Hiromi no Seiyū Banzai!

Radio
 Takehito Koyasu no Hana Yume Kibun de LaLa PARTY (Assistant)
 Suzune no Onegai･･･Kami-sama no Iu Tōri

Drama CD
 Anime Tenchou Series (CoCo Saikōbi)
 Mika ni Harassment (Cocoa Hiyoshizaki)

Game
 Arcana Heart (Kira Daidohji)
 Arcana Heart 2 (Kira Daidohji)
 Arcana Heart 3 (Kira Daidohji)
 Futakoi (Yura Sakurazuki)
 Kaitōranma・Ga (Wakana Ōkouchi)

CD
 Futari no Kiseki (Opening and Ending Themes of "Hiromi to Yumi no Chicchai Futari")

References

External links
 
 Official Profile Japanese
 Hiromi Tsunakake's Tuna Sandwich Japanese

1975 births
Living people
Japanese voice actresses
I'm Enterprise voice actors